Ardleigh  is a village and civil parish in Essex, England.

Ardleigh is in the district of Tendring and the parliamentary constituency of Harwich and North Essex. The village has its own Parish Council. The parish had a population of 2081 according to the 2001 census and includes the area known as Crockleford Heath.

In 1086 Ardleigh was originally owned by Geoffrey de Mandeville. The Great Eastern Main Line passes close to the village but the railway station closed in November 1967. The village is on the A137 road, a route from Colchester to Ipswich, Suffolk.

The area includes a number of smallholdings founded by the Land Settlement Association.

Governance
Ardleigh is part of the electoral ward called Ardleigh and Little Bromley. The population of this ward at the 2011 Census was 2,311.

References

External links

"St Mary The Virgin's Church, Ardleigh", Essex Churches
"Ardleigh's Past", Ancestry.com, Free Pages

Villages in Essex
Civil parishes in Essex
Tendring